Akemi Dawn Bowman is an American author, best known for her William C. Morris Award Finalist young adult novel Starfish, which follows a Japanese-American teen named Kiko Himura who grapples with a toxic home life and attempts to find a back-up plan after being rejected by her dream art school. Bowman's earlier work centered around realistic fiction, but now writes across genres, starting with her sci-fi series The Infinity Courts which released in April 2021.

Personal life 
Bowman was born in Pittsburgh, Pennsylvania and moved to Las Vegas, Nevada when she was a toddler. Her father is from Hawaii and has Japanese and Chinese heritage, and her mother is mostly Italian and Irish. Bowman was home-schooled for four years,  and attended the Las Vegas Academy as a band major in high school. After graduating, she served with the United States Navy for five years as an IT. She started writing her first full-length novel while on deployment. She has a degree in Social Studies from the University of Nevada, Las Vegas. 

Bowman credits music as one of her big writing inspirations, and took flute and piano lessons when she was younger. She often centers mental health in her novels because of her own experiences growing up.

In addition to writing novels, Bowman has written short fiction for the Magic: The Gathering online web story Kamigawa: Neon Dynasty.

She currently lives in Scotland with her family.

Works

Novels
  Starfish  (Simon & Schuster, 2017)
  Summer Bird Blue  (Simon & Schuster, 2018)
  Harley in the Sky  (Simon & Schuster, 2020)
  The Infinity Courts  (Simon & Schuster, 2021)
  Generation Misfits  (Macmillan, 2021)
  The Genesis Wars  (Simon & Schuster, 2022)

Short stories
 in  Kaito Origin Stories: A Test of Loyalty & The Path Forward  (Magic: The Gathering online fiction, 2021)
 in  Kamigawa: Neon Dynasty  (Magic: The Gathering online fiction, 2022)

Accolades

Starred Reviews
 Starfish received starred reviews from Publishers Weekly and Booklist. 
  Summer Bird Blue  received starred reviews from Kirkus, Booklist, and School Library Journal. 
  The Infinity Courts  received a starred review from School Library Journal. 
  Generation Misfits  received starred reviews from School Library Journal and The Bulletin of the Center for Children's Books

Honors
Starfish, Summer Bird Blue, and  Generation Misfits  were each named a Junior Library Guild Gold Standard Selection. Bowman's debut middle-grade novel  Generation Misfits  was featured on the Bulletin of the Center for Children's Books' cover for the July/August 2021 issue, and received a Big Picture honor and a starred review. Starfish was chosen as a New York Public Library 2017 Best Book for Teens, and  Summer Bird Blue  was chosen for the same honor in 2018. Paste Magazine called Starfish the best debut YA novel of 2017, and later declared it one of the top 30 young adult books of the 2010s. In 2021, Harley in the Sky was named a top pick for the Kansas NEA Reading Circle List High School Title. Locus Magazine included The Infinity Courts in their annual Recommended Reading List for the year 2021.

Awards 
Won

 2020 Winner of the MéMO Award for Best Teen Novel for Starfish

Nominated

 2018 William C. Morris YA Debut Award for Starfish
 2019 Colorado Blue Spruce Young Adult Book Award Nominee for Starfish
 2020 Scottish Teenage Book Prize Finalist for Starfish
 2020 Falkirk Red Book Award for Summer Bird Blue
 2022 Locus Award Finalist in the Young Adult Novel category for The Infinity Courts

References 

Living people
Women writers of young adult literature
Year of birth missing (living people)
American writers of Japanese descent
American writers of Chinese descent
21st-century American women writers
American expatriates in Scotland
University of Nevada, Las Vegas alumni
United States Navy sailors
American writers of Irish descent
American writers of Italian descent
Writers from Pittsburgh
American women short story writers
American short story writers of Asian descent
Writers from Las Vegas
American women novelists
American novelists of Asian descent
Novelists from Pennsylvania
Novelists from Nevada
21st-century American novelists